Shaun Filiault is an American politician serving as a member of the New Hampshire House of Representatives from the Cheshire 7 District.  He assumed office December 7, 2022.  He is also chairman of the Keene, New Hampshire, Democratic Committee.

Early life and education 
Filiault was born and raised in New Hampshire and educated in the Keene public school system.  He earned a Bachelor of Arts degree from Boston University before earning his PhD at the University of South Australia. He later earned a Juris Doctor degree from the University of New Hampshire School of Law.

Career 
After earning his PhD, Filiault was a lecturer in health promotion at Flinders University in Adelaide, Australia. He specialized in men's health issues and published numerous articles in men's health promotion and men's body image. He subsequently changed careers and graduated from law school, passing the New York and New Hampshire bar exams. He clerked for Judge William G. Young in the U.S. District Court for the District of Massachusetts.

Electoral History 
In 2020, Filiault won a seat on the Keene School Board. He later resigned that seat because an attorney at the law firm for which he worked was appointed the school district’s counsel and Filiault wished to avoid the possibility of a conflict of interests.

In 2022, Filiault defeated incumbent Rep. John Bordenet in the Democratic primary to represent the newly redistricted Cheshire 7 District, which covers Ward 2 in Keene.  Filiault won that race with 74.9% of the vote to Bordenet’s 25.1% of the vote.  Filiault cited Bordenet’s positions on the “gay panic defense,” gun violence prevention, and marijuana legalization as major reasons for challenging the incumbent Bordenet.  Filiault then defeated Republican nominee David Kamm in the general election, with 73.9% of the vote to Kamm's 26.1%. 

Filiault is a member of House Commerce and Consumer Affairs Committee.

References 

People from Keene, New Hampshire
Boston University alumni
University of South Australia alumni
University of New Hampshire School of Law alumni
Academic staff of Flinders University
Democratic Party members of the New Hampshire House of Representatives
Year of birth missing (living people)
Living people